The 2016 Nippon Professional Baseball (NPB) Draft was held on October 20, for the 52nd time at the Grand Prince Hotel Takanawa to assign amateur baseball players to the NPB. It was arranged with the special cooperation of Taisho Pharmaceutical Co. with official naming rights. The draft was officially called "The Professional Baseball Draft Meeting supported by Lipovitan D".

Summary 

Only the first round picks were allowed to be contested with all picks from the second round onward being based on table placing in the 2016 NPB season in a waiver system. Waiver priority was based on inter-league results. As the Pacific League teams came out on top against Central League opposition, Pacific League teams were given preference.  From the third round the order was reversed continuing in the same fashion until all picks were exhausted.

Due to Tokyo Yakult Swallows manager Mitsuru Manaka's mistake at the 2015 edition of the draft, losing tickets in the lottery were made blank as to avoid confusion with winning tickets emblazoned with "Negotiation Rights Acquired."

87 new players were drafted with a further 28 development players selected.

First Round Contested Picks 

 Bolded teams indicate who won the right to negotiate contract following a lottery.
 In the first round, Taisuke Yamaoka (Pitcher) was selected by the Buffaloes,  Shoma Fujihira (Pitcher) by the Eagles, Naruki Terashima (Pitcher) by the Swallows,  Tatsuya Imai (Pitcher) by the Lions, and Yusuke Oyama (Infielder) by the Tigers without a bid lottery.
 In the thrird round, Haruhiro Hamaguchi (Pitcher) was selected by the BayStars,  Naoki Yoshikawa (Infielder) by the Giants,  Mizuki Hori (Pitcher) by the Fighters, and Takuya Katoh (Pitcher) by the Carp without a bid lottery.
 List of selected players.

Selected Players 

The order of the teams is the order of second round waiver priority.
 Bolded After that, a developmental player who contracted as a registered player under control.
 List of selected players.

Orix Buffaloes

Chunichi Dragons

Tohoku Rakuten Golden Eagles

Tokyo Yakult Swallows

Saitama Seibu Lions

Hanshin Tigers

Chiba Lotte Marines

Yokohama DeNA BayStars

Fukuoka SoftBank Hawks

Yomiuri Giants

Hokkaido Nippon-Ham Fighters

Hiroshima Toyo Carp

References

External links 
 プロ野球ドラフト会議 supported by リポビタンD - NPB.jp Nippon Professional Baseball
 Sponichi 2016 NPB Draft (Japanese)

Nippon Professional Baseball draft
Draft
Nippon Professional Baseball draft
Nippon Professional Baseball draft
Baseball in Japan
Sport in Tokyo
Events in Tokyo